Kill Boksoon is a 2023 South Korean crime action film directed and written by Byun Sung-hyun, starring Jeon Do-yeon, Sol Kyung-gu, Esom, and Koo Kyo-hwan. It is slated to release on Netflix on March 31, 2023.

Synopsis 
Gil Bok-soon (Jeon Do-yeon), a legendary killer in the contract killing industry, gets caught up in an unavoidable confrontation just before renewing her contract with the company.

Cast

Main 
 Jeon Do-yeon as Gil Bok-soon
 Park Se-hyun as young Gil Bok-soon
 A single mother and the best killer of MK. ENT and referred as "Kill Boksoon" by industry insiders.
 Sol Kyung-gu as Cha Min-kyu
 Lee Jae-wook as young Cha Min-kyu
 CEO of MK. ENT.
 Esom as Cha Min-hee
 Director of MK. ENT and younger sister of Min-kyu.
 Koo Kyo-hwan as Han Hee-seong
 An affiliated killer of MK. ENT.
 Kim Si-a as Gil Jae-yeong
 The daughter of Bok-soon who knows nothing about her mother's profession.

Supporting 
 Lee Yeon as Kim Yeong-ji
 A member of MK. ENT.
 Park Kwang-jae
 Jang In-sub
 Choi Byung-mo
 Kim Sung-oh
 Kim Ki-cheon
 Gi Ju-bong
 Kim Jun-bae
 Jang Hyun-sung

Special appearance 
 Hwang Jung-min

Production 
On January 4, 2022, Kill Boksoon confirmed production with ensemble casting of Jeon Do-yeon, Sol Kyung-gu, Esom, and Koo Kyo-hwan as the lead roles. On April 7, 2022, it was reported that actress Jeon Do-yeon was injured while filming and stopped filming, but after receiving treatment at the hospital, she returned to the scene and continued filming.

Release 
The film was officially invited to the Berlinale Special section at the 73rd Berlin International Film Festival, had its world premiere on February 18, 2023. It will be released only on Netflix on March 31, 2023.

References

External links 
 
 
 
 
 
 
 

2023 films
2020s Korean-language films
Korean-language Netflix original films
Upcoming Netflix original films
2023 LGBT-related films
South Korean LGBT-related films
South Korean action thriller films
LGBT-related thriller films
2020s South Korean films